The 1949–50 NBA season was the fourth and final season for the Chicago Stags of the National Basketball Association (NBA). The team ceased operations after the season, and Chicago would be left without an NBA team until 1961.

NBA Draft

Roster

Regular season

Season standings

Record vs. opponents

Game log

Playoffs

Central Division Semifinals
(1) Minneapolis Lakers vs. (4) Chicago Stags: Lakers win series 2-0
Game 1 @ Minneapolis (March 22): Minneapolis 85, Chicago 75
Game 2 @ Chicago (March 25): Minneapolis 75, Chicago 67

Last playoff meeting: 1949 Western Division Semifinals (Minneapolis won 2-0)

References

Chicago Stags seasons
Chicago